Edward Goldie (15 May 1873 – after 1898) was a Scottish professional footballer who played as an inside forward.

References

1873 births
Footballers from Motherwell
Scottish footballers
Association football inside forwards
Newton Thistle F.C. players
Cambuslang Hibernian F.C. players
Motherwell F.C. players
Grimsby Town F.C. players
Reading F.C. players
Bristol City F.C. players
Scottish Football League players
Scottish Junior Football Association players
English Football League players
Year of death missing